A detention center, or  detention centre, is any location used for detention. Specifically, it can mean:
 A jail or prison, a facility in which inmates are forcibly confined and denied a variety of freedoms under the authority of the state as a form of punishment after being convicted of crimes
 A structure for immigration detention
 An internment camp
 A youth detention center, a secure prison or jail for persons under the age of majority

Biology
 Detention center (cell biology), a nucleolar detention center in cell biology